WEFA may refer to:

 WEFA-LP, a low-power radio station (92.5 FM) licensed to serve Ocala, Florida, United States
 Wharton Econometric Forecasting Associates